Thailand witnessed several uprisings by farmers from several central Thai provinces in the mid-1970s. Thailand, transitioning to democratic government after nearly forty years of dictatorship, was beset by revolution involving several segments of the population. Farmers were one of several politicized groups that rioted on the streets. They implored Thai Prime Minister Thanom Kittikachorn to reduce their debt and to ensure fair rice prices.

These appeals were ignored, with the prime minister refusing to meet with farmers. In their desperation, farmers tried to enact change by themselves. Unafraid of creditors and other capitalists, they hoped for a change which would free them from debt-bondage. They announced their intention to cease paying taxes and refused to recognise the authority of Thai state leadership. By setting up an autonomous liberated zone, the farmers sought greater freedom and the ability to better influence rice crop prices in order to better sustain themselves.	

The aims of the farmer's revolt were to be recognised for their contributions to the state and subsequently to be treated with respect equal to that of their landlords. From the revolt, the Farmers Federation of Thailand (FFT), a national, autonomous Thai farmers organisation, emerged. The FFT led the struggle in northern Thailand to pass a law which standardised and lowered the level of rents on rice land, the Land Rent Control Act (LRCA) of December 1974.

What followed in the wake of the 14 October 1973 movement were mass protests by farmers and their allies such as students and professional classes who challenged the ruling elite to improve the lives of farmers. The revolt antagonized landowners and state officials. In response, activists were harassed and murders were to follow. Between March 1974 and September 1979, 21 FTT leaders were assassinated with the killings concentrated in the Chiang Mai region.  The assassination of FTT leaders created an environment of pervasive fear in the countryside and ended the revolutionary efforts of the FTT.

Social and economic situation

Major issues in Thai society were rural poverty and regional underdevelopment. Cities enjoyed sharp growth and along with it, a growing and prospering urban middle class. Composing up to 78 percent of Thailand's total labour force, peasant farmers formed the largest occupational group in Thailand. Agricultural output, mainly rice, accounted for nearly 30 percent of Thailand's GDP.

The producers of these commodities, however, were not among the beneficiaries. Farmers depended on rice sales to survive. To better protect themselves, they organised themselves and formed a national coalition of farmers against exploitative market conditions. Though the farmers attempted in vain to defend their livelihood and source of income, their efforts were systematically frustrated by governmental authorities in collusion with landlords and others with vested interests in ensuring that rice prices remained low. In the 1970s a Thai farmer's average per capita income was only US$49. In contrast, the average national per capita income was US$125, and that of urban residents stood at US$428.

The growing income gap 

Source: News report in Prachtnippatai, 23 Jul 1974. quoted from Akira Takahashi, "Thailand: Growing Land Problems", in Z. M. Ahmadi, ed., Land Reform in Asia, Geneva, 1976, p. 118.

Thailand had not previously suffered from the runaway population growth found in most developing nations. The productivity of its soil, along with its external environment, combined with a non-existent political culture, based on the tenets of respect and love for a hereditary monarch, had the effect of creating political passivity in Thailand's rural population. But several policy changes enacted by the government had an adverse effect on rural Thailand, particularly during the period of open politics from 1973-1976. The combination of a sudden uptick in Thailand's population along with the increasing scarcity of arable land led to increasing political and social conflict.

Invariably, tenancy and debts increased among farmers, especially in the north and central plains. Though there was increased interaction between farmers and governmental officials due to improved infrastructure and the increasing presence of the government in the countryside, the nature of these interactions was frequently negative. Farmers were distrustful and over a period of time finally reached their breaking point. They turned to  political action to make their grievances known to the government. In an era of more open politics, there were instances of petitions against land rents and demonstrations leading to the emergence of the Farmer Federation of Thailand (FFT). The FFT frequently clashed with the ruling elite in its attempt to improve the lives of the Thai farmers.

Rice production policies

Rice is central to Thailand's economy and culture. Cultivation occupies approximately 55 percent of Thailand's arable land and is the staple food across all income brackets.
Thailand in the 1970s invested heavily in infrastructure improvements, agricultural research, and road networks to increase its rice production. The use of technology, combined with advanced knowledge of rice strains and fertilisers, along with helpful governmental policies, increased rice production. From the 1950s to the 1970s, rice production per unit of land increased by almost 50 percent.

Concomitantly, the government sought to accelerate growth in urban areas. One of its policies was to tax the rice industry and use the profits to fund much-needed projects in the larger cities. Thai authorities levied taxes on rice exports known as the "rice premium". This increased tax revenues, while at the same time decreasing the price of rice domestically. The government, in enacting this policy, shifted from protecting the farmers to leaving the rice industry to market forces, often leading to unbridled profit taking.

Though technology had greatly improved rice production, it had not translated into success for peasant farmers. Escalating prices left many farmers unable to hold onto their lands. Many had to become tenants to sustain themselves. Despite uncertainty in the Thai economy, the government appeared unconcerned. Taxes were collected good year or bad, which further drove down farming profits.

The introduction of new technology meant that rice farming barriers to entry mounted, leaving most peasant farmers unable to own their land outright. Larger farming operations were able to meet the rising costs of these new technologies and were able to purchase fertiliser, improved rice strains, and machinery without much problem. The average farmer though, had to make a living as a manual labourer on a farm earning barely enough to feed himself and his family.

Problems of tenancy and rural debt
The construction of new rural infrastructure was initiated and managed by the bureaucratic elite in Bangkok rather than by rural villagers. At the top, corruption was prevalent. High-ranking officials received kickbacks. While the government sought to implement measures to improve agricultural output, these projects in general did relatively little to improve farmer's lives. Instead, the agricultural sector was plagued by the growing issues of indebtedness and land shortages. The country's total agricultural debt was estimated at 143 million baht, with the bulk of the debt (78 percent) concentrated in Chiang Mai and the central plains.

Though indebtedness in rural areas was present as early as the 1930s, farmers during that period still owned their lands outright. Tenant farmers and absentee landlords were non-existent. A survey conducted by the National Statistical Office found that 40 percent of farmers were renting out part or all of their land they farmed in the central plains. In Chiang Mai and other northern regions, up to 18 percent of farmers were tenants, whereas in other areas of Thailand the figures were comparatively lower.

Eight years later, another study was conducted which found 56 percent of farmers in the central plains rented some of the lands they tilled while 27 percent did not own any land at all. In a decade, the rate of tenancy in the central area had more than doubled with only approximately 17 percent of farmers fully independent of landlords. The report also found that four of every five farming families were in debt for an aggregate sum of 16 billion baht. The average farm family debt was US$200, compared to an average family income of less than US$300 a year. Some of the families lived on US$25 or less a year.

A number of significant factors contributed to the higher rates of tenancy, rural indebtedness, and land rents in the north and central plains. It was found that the land holdings in the north were smaller than in any other region of the country, thus reducing efficiency. Farming was done on a much smaller scale, which combined with lower productivity, yielded low incomes.

Population growth in Thailand 
As the Thai economy evolved with higher standards of living, farmers saw their incomes shrink. Small scale farming operations had to borrow from money lenders, usually middlemen involved in the rice trade or owners of rice mills. The loans made at high interest rates. The problems of land fragmentation and subdivision also contributed to problems in the north. A report submitted by the Food and Agricultural Organisation (FAO) found that subdivision of land holdings was growing rapidly in Thailand. Sub-divisions occurred mostly following the death of the landholder.

Source: Compiled from National Economic and Social Development Board (NESDB), Bangkok.

Relations between farmers and landlords 
Aggravating the situation, farmers, often illiterate, were often cheated. When harvests were poor, farmers had no choice but to mortgage their land as collateral to obtain a loan. Should the farmer fail to repay the loan, he would forfeit his land. Farmers with a run of bad harvests, combined with high interest rates, would lose ownership of their land.

Farmers in the central and northern plains have suffered from severe indebtedness since the 1930s. By the 1970s, most of the farmers had lost their land to creditors. The government ignored this issue as Thai farmers lacked political clout. Farmers were seen as disorganised, scattered, and politically apathetic, accepting misfortune and poverty as their lot in life. This all changed in 1973, when farmers decided to take matters into their own hands and sought to change their lives.

The political mobilization of farmers
1973 was a watershed year for Thai politics. The government transitioned from a military dictatorship to a moderate civilian government. This provided an opening for the political mobilisation and participation of various segments of society in the political affairs of the country. Social discontent and the urgent needs of oppressed classes formerly subjugated by authoritarian rule, were thrust into the forefront and these issues were openly raised. Labour disputes were suddenly discussed with great vigour.

Students and professional classes such as teachers and lawyers, fearful for their own long-term political survival, joined farmers to air their grievances. Student activists convinced farmers to organise themselves into a political body in order to pressure the government to act on their behalf. During 1973 and 1974, farmers took to the streets and protested against local district officers and other officials.

Tenant farmers in the north and on the central plains were particularly demonstrative. Activists helped to organise several complaints against land owners over land mortgages and unfair land rents and also against local officials for corruption. Thousands of farmers marched to the prime minister's office in Bangkok to demand the return of their lands from landlords, middlemen, and creditors. The demonstrations signaled the farmers' will and determination to implement policies which would change the landscape of the agricultural sector after years of abuse and neglect by Thai authorities.

In March 1974, farmers, supported by the NSCT (National Students Center of Thailand), staged their first large-scale protest, gaining nationwide attention for their demands to increase rice prices. From August to November 1974, land disputes were widespread and discontent was vented. Newspaper reports reported that approximately 7,000 farmers from eight different provinces threatened to relinquish their Thai identification cards and go about setting up a "liberated area" unless the government met their demands.

On 19 November 1974, the assembled farmer representatives in Bangkok declared the formation of the Farmers Federation of Thailand (FFT). FFT then handed the government a list of demands. The government acceded to some of the demands of the FFT, albeit slowly. A few half-hearted agrarian reform laws were passed, including the seed certification law, a land rental law, and a moderate land reform law. The FFT clamoured for the Land Rent Control Act (LRCA) to be ratified and its laws to be made applicable to the whole country. It was finally enacted in December 1974.

The 1974 act was more extensive and differed from an earlier 1950 law in terms of application, terms of rent, and terms of enforcement. The 1974 act stipulated the establishment of provincial and district committees to oversee its implementation and administration and also to mediate conflicts between tenants and farmers. The officials on these committees were to be selected from the sub-districts where there was land tenancy. By involving farmers directly in the administration of the law, farmers were to be entitled to a fair hearing from fellow farmers rather than government bureaucrats.

The 1974 act also established the need to assess land quality and harvest success when determining rental amounts, as opposed to the 1950s act which stipulated rental amounts from 5 to 25 percent of the harvest irrespective of other factors. The act thus brought welcome relief from exorbitant rents.

Assassinations of FFT leaders

The three years between 14 October 1973 and 6 October 1976 were a tumultuous period filled with political possibilities and change in Thailand. Groups whose political action was restricted under military rule organised and protested in unprecedented numbers. Thais from all walks of life transcended class and social status to challenge injustice. But throughout 1975 and 1976, students, journalists, socialists, employees, and farmers were subject to growing harassment, intimidation, threats, and finally assassination. From March 1974 to August 1975, approximately 21 FFT leaders were murdered.

It was thought that these murders were committed to intimidate. All those murdered were active FFT members. The killings took place within a short span of time. In many instances, the murders pointed to the work of a highly professional assassin and not to random murder by an angry villager motivated by revenge.

Murdered FFT activists

Source: David Morell: Political Conflict in Thailand: Reform, Reaction, Revolution.

Assassinated early were ordinary members of the FFT. As the killings continued, top leaders such as Intha became targets. The killings were a clear warning to FFT leaders to cease their activities if they wished to remain alive. The murder campaign ultimately derailed FFT efforts. The organisation ceased growing and diminished as a political party. By 1976, the party was seldom heard of again. The FFT had a small group of important individuals who were experienced and familiar with the complexities of the Land Control Act. With their murders and others afraid for their lives, the FFT collapsed.

Thirty years on, various issues surrounding this period of political possibility, the imaginings of a different and fair future for the ordinary people of Thailand and the death of those dreams, remains unresolved and understudied. Thongchai Winichakul, a prominent Southeast Asian scholar, argues that the massacre that took place at Thammasat University and the assassinations of FFT farmers continue to be shrouded in silence and fear.

See also

 1973 Thai student uprising
 Agriculture in Thailand

References

1970s in Thailand
Nonviolent revolutions
Protests in Thailand
Rebellions in Thailand
Economic history of Thailand
Political history of Thailand
Poverty in Thailand